Hastings Cemetery is a cemetery in Hastings, East Sussex, England.

The cemetery was opened on 28 November 1856. The Church of England section was consecrated by Ashurst Gilbert, Bishop of Chichester, followed by a service in All Saints Church.

Hastings Crematorium is located within the cemetery. It was built in 1955, incorporating two Gothic-style burial chapels built in 1856 of local sandstone.

Notable burials
 Major-General Sir Edward Anson (1826–1925), army officer
 Frederick Chamier (1796–1870), Royal Navy officer and writer
 Major-General John Granville Harkness (1831–1900), army officer
 Arthur Foord Hughes (1856–1914), artist
 George Monger (1840–1887)
 W. S. Penley (1851–1912), singer, actor, and comedian
 Sergiusz Piasecki (1901–1964), Belarusian-Polish novelist
 Arthur Banks Skinner (1861–1911), director of the Victoria and Albert Museum
 Anna McNeill Whistler (1804–1881), the subject of the painting Whistler's Mother
 William McNeill Whistler (1836–1900)

War graves
Hastings Cemetery contains the war graves of 176 Commonwealth service personnel (including two unidentified Royal Navy sailors) of World War I and 69 of World War II. Those whose graves could not be individually marked are listed on a Screen Wall Memorial. There are also buried here a Belgian army soldier of World War I and a German soldier and six German airmen of World War II.

References

External links 
 Friends of Hastings Cemetery
 

Cemeteries in East Sussex
Burials at Hastings Cemetery
Hastings